Jan Verhoeven (1940 or 1941 – 24 April 2021) was a Dutch singer from Heusden. He started collaborating with  after spontaneously joining her as a second singer during a party and from 1988 they had the name "Holland Duo". With Weber he recorded three albums. Later he continued under the same name with Colinda van Beckhoven, Janske Mentzij and Erna Temming.

He had a daughter Nina, who was also a singer who released her first single in 1994. Verhoeven died on 24 April 2021, aged 80. After his death, Sterren NL Radio of NPO Radio 5 paid special attention to his death during the afternoon show.

References

External links
 
  Entry for Nina

20th-century Dutch male singers
1940s births
2021 deaths
People from Heusden
Place of birth missing
Place of death missing